Shahid Mofatteh Metro Station may refer to:

 Shahid Mofatteh Metro Station (Tehran)
 Shahid Mofatteh Metro Station (Mashhad)